Blake Marshall (born May 17, 1965, in Guelph, Ontario) was Canadian football player with the Edmonton Eskimos for 8 seasons. He won the CFL's Most Outstanding Canadian Award in 1991 when he tied a CFL record with 20 total touchdowns and was a CFL All-Star three years in a row.

He resides in London, Ontario and owns a pasta restaurant in North London. He is the brother of Greg Marshall

References 

1965 births
Living people
Canadian football fullbacks
Canadian Football League Most Outstanding Canadian Award winners
Edmonton Elks players
Players of Canadian football from Ontario
Sportspeople from London, Ontario
Western Mustangs football players